Greenbrier is an unincorporated community in the southeastern part of Wayne Township in Bollinger County, Missouri, United States. The name Greenbrier been attributed as being due to the vegetation growing in the area, particularly blackberry and other green briers. The community was situated along the branch railroad which connected Brownwood in Stoddard County to Zalma. A post office was in operation between the years 1889–1957.

References 

Unincorporated communities in Bollinger County, Missouri
Cape Girardeau–Jackson metropolitan area
Unincorporated communities in Missouri